Peavine Trail may refer to:
 A section of rail trail in the Granite Dells, near Prescott, Arizona
 Peavine Trail, an old railroad bed in southern Florida, now part of Florida State Road 724